The Romanes Lecture is a prestigious free public lecture given annually at the Sheldonian Theatre, Oxford, England.

The lecture series was founded by, and named after, the biologist George Romanes, and has been running since 1892. Over the years, many notable figures from the Arts and Sciences have been invited to speak. The lecture can be on any subject in science, art or literature, approved by the Vice-Chancellor of the University.

List of Romanes lecturers and lecture subjects

1890s
1892 William Ewart Gladstone — An Academic Sketch  (A report of the speech is available in the digital archive of The Nation.)
1893 Thomas Henry Huxley     — Evolution and Ethics   (See also  a contemporary review of Huxley's lecture)
1894 August Weismann         — The Effect of External Influences upon Development
1895 Holman Hunt — The Obligations of the Universities towards Art
1896 Mandell Creighton — The English National Character
1897 John Morley             — Machiavelli
1898 Archibald Geikie        — Types of Scenery and their Influence on Literature
1899 Richard Claverhouse Jebb — Humanism in Education

1900s

 1900 James Murray — The Evolution of English Lexicography (Also available at The Oxford English Dictionary site.)
 1901 Lord Acton — The German school of history
 1902 James Bryce — The Relations of the Advanced and the Backward Races of Mankind
 1903 Oliver Lodge — Modern views on matter
 1904 Courtenay Ilbert — Montesquieu
 1905 Ray Lankester — Nature and Man
 1906 William Paton Ker — Sturla the Historian
 1907 Lord Curzon — Frontiers
 1908 Henry Scott Holland — The optimism of Butler's 'Analogy'
 1909 Arthur Balfour — Criticism and Beauty

1910s

 1910 Theodore Roosevelt — Biological Analogies in History
 1911 J.B. Bury — Romances of Chivalry on Greek Soil
 1912 Henry Montagu Butler — Lord Chatham as an Orator
 1913 William Mitchell Ramsay — The Imperial Peace: an ideal in European history
 1914 J. J. Thomson – The Atomic Theory
 1915 E. B. Poulton – Science and the Great War
 1916
 1917
 1918 Herbert Henry Asquith — Some Aspects of The Victorian Age
 1919

1920s

 1920 William Ralph Inge — The Idea of Progress
 1921 Joseph Bédier — Roland à Roncevaux
 1922 Arthur Stanley Eddington — The theory of relativity and its influence on scientific thought
 1923 John Burnet — Ignorance
 1924 John Masefield — Shakespeare & spiritual life
 1925 William Henry Bragg — The Crystalline State
 1926 G.M. Trevelyan — The Two-Party System in English Political History
 1927 Frederick George Kenyon — Museums and National Life
 1928 D. M. S. Watson — Palaeontology and the Evolution of Man
 1929 Sir John William Fortescue — The Vicissitudes of Organized Power

1930s

 1930 Winston Churchill — Parliamentary Government and the Economic Problem
 1931 John Galsworthy — The Creation of Character in Literature
 1932 Berkley Moynihan — The Advance of Medicine
 1933 Henry Hadow — The Place of Music among the Arts
 1934 William Rothenstein — Form and content in English Painting
 1935 Gilbert Murray — Then and Now
 1936 Donald Francis Tovey — Normality and Freedom in Music
 1937 Harley Granville-Barker — On Poetry in Drama
 1938 Lord Robert Cecil — Peace and Pacifism
 1939 Laurence Binyon — Art and freedom

1940s

 1940 Edouard Herriot, lecture not delivered
 1941 William Hailey — The position of colonies in a British commonwealth of nations
 1942 Norman H. Baynes — Intellectual liberty and totalitarian claims
 1943 Julian Huxley — Evolutionary Ethics (50 years after his grandfather gave the lecture)
 1944 G. M. Young — Mr Gladstone
 1945 André Siegfried — Characteristics and Limits of our Western Civilization
 1946 John Anderson — The machinery of government
 1947 Lord Samuel — Creative Man
 1948 Lord Brabazon of Tara — Forty years of flight
 1949 Claud Schuster — Mountaineering

1950s

 1950 John Cockcroft — The development and future of nuclear energy
 1951 Maurice Hankey — The science and art of government
 1952 Lewis Bernstein Namier — Monarchy and the party system
 1953 Viscount Simon — Crown and Commonwealth
 1954 Kenneth Clark — Moments of Vision
 1955 Albert Richardson — The significance of the fine arts
 1956 Thomas Beecham — John Fletcher
 1957 Ronald Knox — On English translation
 1958 Edward Bridges — The State and the Arts
 1959 Lord Denning — From Precedent to Precedent

1960s

 1960 Edgar Douglas Adrian — Factors in mental evolution
 1961 Vincent Massey — Canadians and Their Commonwealth
 1962 Cyril Radcliffe — Mountstuart Elphinstone
 1963 Violet Bonham Carter — The impact of personality in politics (45 years after her father gave the lecture)
 1964 Harold Hartley — Man and Nature
 1965 Noel Annan — The Disintegration of an Old Culture
 1966 Maurice Bowra — A case for humane learning
 1967 Rab Butler — The Difficult Art of Autobiography
 1968 Peter Medawar — Science and Literature
 1969 Lord Holford — A World of Room

1970s

 1970 Isaiah Berlin — Fathers and Children: Turgenev and the Liberal Predicament (Broadcast on BBC Radio 3 on 14 February 1971)
 1971 Raymond Aron — On the Use and Abuse of Futurology
 1972 Karl Popper — On the Problem of Body and Mind
 1973 Ernst Gombrich — Art History and the Social Sciences
 1974 Solly Zuckermann — Advice and Responsibility
 1975 Iris Murdoch — The Fire and the Sun: Why Plato banished the artists
 1976 Edward Heath — The Future of a Nation
 1977 Peter Hall — Form and Freedom in the Theatre
 1978 George Porter — Science and the Human Purpose
 1979 Hugh Casson — The arts and the academies

1980s

 1980 Jo Grimond — Is political philosophy based on a mistake?
 1981 A.J.P. Taylor — War in Our Time
 1982 Andrew Huxley — Biology, the Physical Sciences and the Mind
 1983  Owen Chadwick — Religion and Society
 1984
 1985 Miriam Louisa Rothschild — Animals and Man
 1986 Nicholas Henderson — Different Approaches to Foreign Policy
 1987 Norman St. John-Stevas — The Omnipresence of Walter Bagehot
 1988 Hugh Trevor-Roper — The Lost Moments of History (A revised version at the NYRB.)
 1989

1990s

 1990 Saul Bellow — The Distracted Public
 1991 Gianni Agnelli — Europe: Many Legacies, One Future
 1992 Robert Blake — Gladstone, Disraeli and Queen Victoria (The Centenary Lecture)
 1993 Henry Harris — Hippolyte's club foot: the medical roots of realism in modern European literature
 1994 Lord Slynn of Hadley — Europe and Human Rights
 1995 Walter Bodmer — The Book of Man
 1996 Roy Jenkins — The Chancellorship of Oxford: A Contemporary View with a Little History
 1997 Mary Robinson  — Realizing Human Rights:"Take hold of it boldly and duly..."
 1998 Amartya Sen — Reason before identity.
 1999 Tony Blair  — The Learning Habit

2000s

 2000 William G. Bowen  — At a Slight Angle to the Universe: The University in a Digitized, Commercialized Age
 2001 Neil MacGregor — The Perpetual Present. The Ideal of Art for All
 2002 Tom Bingham — Personal Freedom and the Dilemma of Democracies
 2003 Paul Nurse — The great ideas of biology
 2004 Rowan Williams — Religious lives
 2005 Shirley M. Tilghman — Strange bedfellows: science, politics, and religion
 2006 Lecture was to have been delivered by Gordon Brown, but was postponed
 2007 Dame Gillian Beer — Darwin and the Consciousness of Others
 2008 Muhammad Yunus — Poverty Free World: When? How?
 2009 Gordon Brown — Science and our Economic Future

2010s
 2011 (June) Andrew Motion — Bonfire of the Humanities
 2011 (November) Martin Rees — The Limits of Science
 2014 Steven Chu — Our Energy and Climate Change Challenges and Solutions
 2015 Mervyn King — A Disequilibrium in the World Economy
 2016 Patricia Scotland — The Commonwealth of Nations
 2018 (June) Hillary Clinton – Making the Case for Democracy
 2018 (November) Vint Cerf – The Pacification of Cyberspace
2019 Eliza Manningham-Buller - The Profession of Intelligence

2020s 

 2020 Brenda Hale - Law in a Time of Crisis
 2021 Dame Catherine Elizabeth Bingham, DBE - Lessons from the Vaccine Taskforce
 2022 Micheál Martin - The Centre Will Hold: Liberal Democracy and the Populist Threat

See also
 List of public lecture series
 Robert Boyle Lecture

References
The text of each Romanes Lecture is generally published by Oxford University Press using the "Clarendon Press" imprint, and where appropriate the citation for an individual lecture is listed in the published works of each author's entry in Wikipedia.

 Romanes lectures, University of Oxford, 1986–2002, Oxford, Bodleian Library: MSS. Eng. c. 7027, Top. Oxon. c. 827
 Oxford lectures on philosophy, 1910–1923, Oxford, The Clarendon Press, 1908–23.
 Oxford lectures on history, 1904–1923, Oxford, The Clarendon Press 1904–23, which includes "Frontiers", by Lord Curzon, the Romanes lecture for 1907, "Biological analogies in history", by Theodore Roosevelt, the Romanes lecture for 1910, "The imperial peace" by Sir W. M. Ramsay, the Romanes lecture for 1913 and "Montesquieu" by Sir Courtenay Ilbert, the Romanes lecture for 1904.
 J.B. Bury, Romances of chivalry on Greek soil, being the Romanes lecture for 1911, Oxford, Clarendon Press, 1911.
 Sir E. Ray Lankester: Romanes Lecture, Nature and Man, Oxford University Press, 1905

Notes

External links
 Romanes Lectures since 1892 at the University web site.

Recurring events established in 1892
Lecture series at the University of Oxford
Lists of events
1892 establishments in England
Annual events in England